Carl-Gunne Fälthammar (born 4 December 1931, Markaryd, Sweden) is Professor Emeritus at the Royal Institute of Technology in Stockholm, Sweden, specialising in space and plasma physics in the School of Electrical Engineering. He succeeded Hannes Alfvén as Professor of Plasma Physics in 1975.

His research interests include plasma electrodynamics, with application to space and astrophysical plasmas, especially in the context of auroral and magnetospheric physics. He is also the Associate Editor of the journal Astrophysics and Space Science.

Education
In 1956 he earned the Swedish equivalent to a master's degree (civilingenjör), and in 1960 the equivalent of a Ph.D. (Tekn. lic.), and in 1966 the position of Docent (approximately assistant professor), all from the Royal Institute of Technology in Stockholm.

Career

From July 1967 until June 1997, Fälthammar headed the Division of Plasma Physics of the Alfvén Laboratory. In 1969, he became Associate Professor of Plasma Physics at the Royal Institute of Technology, and in 1975, succeeded Hannes Alfvén as Professor of Plasma Physics there.

Awards
In 1989, he was awarded an Honorary Doctor's degree by the Faculty of Science of the University of Oulu, Finland. He is also a recipient of the Golden Badge Award of the European Geophysical Society and the Basic Sciences Award of the International Academy of Astronautics. In 1998 he was awarded the Hannes Alfvén Medal of the European Geophysical Society in recognition of his services as Editor of the Society’s journal Annales Geophysicae.

Bibliography

Books
Magnetospheric Physics - Achievements and prospects (1993) co-authored with Bengt Hultqvist, Plenum Publ. Co. Ltd., London, UK, 1990, 190 pp., hard cover. $65.00/s. .
 Cosmical electrodynamics: fundamental principles (1962) co-authored with Hannes Alfvén, Clarendon Press, Oxford.

Papers
Papers listed on the Smithsonian/NASA Astrophysics Data System (ADS)

Footnotes

Academic staff of the KTH Royal Institute of Technology
Swedish physicists
Members of the Royal Swedish Academy of Sciences
Living people
1931 births